Gendros is a suburban district of the City and County of Swansea, Wales falling within the Cockett ward.  Gendros approximates to the settlement northwest of Carmarthen Road (A483 road) between Cwmdu and Penlan.  Other areas surrounding Gendros are Blaen-y-Maes, Ravenhill, Cwmbwrla, Cockett, Fforestfach and Mayhill and Townhill. Its post code begins with SA5.

Gendros has two churches, a primary school, a community centre, 2 parks, a library and multiple shops throughout, it's connected to Upper Kings Head, Carmarthen Road and Middle Road.

It is also the birthplace of the famous British boxer Enzo Maccarinelli, a former World Cruiserweight Champion. It is also home to Chris Holley, the ex-mayor of Swansea.
The former boxer Neville Meade also resided in the area during the 1980s and 1990s.

Districts of Swansea